Leopold Joseph may refer to:

Leopold, Duke of Lorraine (1679 - 1729)
Archduke Leopold Joseph of Austria (1700-1701) 
Archduke Leopold Joseph of Austria (1682-1684)
Leopold Joseph, a British merchant bank acquired by Butterfield Bank